The National Democratic Movement (/Narodni demokratski pokret, NDP) is a political party in Bosnia and Herzegovina led by Dragan Čavić.

History
The party was established on 9 June 2013 as a merger of the Democratic Party and the National Democratic Party. In April 2014 the New Socialist Party merged into the NDP.

In the 2014 elections the party contested the national elections in an alliance with the Party of Democratic Progress, with the alliance winning a single seat in the national House of Representatives. The NDP contested the elections in Republika Srpska alone, winning five seats in the National Assembly.

Election results

References

External links
Official website 

Pro-European political parties in Bosnia and Herzegovina
Serb political parties in Bosnia and Herzegovina
Political parties in Republika Srpska
Political parties established in 2013
2013 establishments in Bosnia and Herzegovina